Pierre-Marie Coty (22 November 1927 – 17 July 2020) was an Ivorian Roman Catholic bishop.

Coty was born in the Ivory Coast and was ordained to the priesthood in 1955. He served as bishop of the Roman Catholic Diocese of Daloa, Ivory Coast from 1975 to 2005.

Notes

1927 births
2020 deaths
20th-century Roman Catholic bishops in Ivory Coast
21st-century Roman Catholic bishops in Ivory Coast
Roman Catholic bishops of Daloa